Cicognani is an Italian surname that may refer to

Amleto Giovanni Cicognani (1883–1973), Italian cardinal
Gaetano Cicognani (1881–1962), Italian cardinal, brother of Amleto
Miranda Cicognani (born 1936), Italian gymnast
Rosella Cicognani (born 1939), Italian gymnast, sister of Miranda

Italian-language surnames